Baccara was a female vocal duo formed in 1977 by Spanish artists Mayte Mateos (born 7 February 1951) and María Mendiola (4 April 1952 – 11 September 2021). The duo rapidly achieved international success with their debut single "Yes Sir, I Can Boogie", which reached number one across much of Europe and became the best-selling single of all time by a female group, eventually selling more than 18 million copies worldwide. A successful follow-up single ("Sorry, I'm a Lady") and European tour led to a number of album releases, numerous television appearances and the duo's selection to represent Luxembourg in the Eurovision Song Contest 1978.

Despite a substantial following in Spain, Germany and Japan, by 1981 their blend of disco, pop and Spanish folk music was no longer fashionable, and by 1983 Mateos and Mendiola were both working on solo projects. Achieving little success as solo artists, the two formed duos of their own: separate incarnations of the original Baccara appeared during the middle of the decade, with Mendiola fronting New Baccara and Mateos keeping the duo's original name. During the 1990s, New Baccara reverted to Baccara and as a consequence both Mateos and Mendiola headed different duos with the same name. Both principals subsequently had prolonged but separate legacy careers based on nostalgia and their earlier fame.

Mendiola's Baccara has seen more international recognition, releasing a string of Hi-NRG club hits such as "Fantasy Boy" and "Touch Me" in the late 1980s and the later UK club hit "Wind Beneath My Wings". Mateos' Baccara has released few new recordings, but has remained in demand for television and live appearances in countries such as Spain and Germany, where the original Baccara developed a loyal fan base, performing the duo's back-catalogue and modernised versions of traditional Spanish songs.

Formation
In 1976, María Mendiola (prima ballerina of Alberto Portillo's Spanish Television ballet) proposed to her colleague Mayte Mateos the formation of a separate singing and dancing duo (using the title Venus). After leaving the ballet company, the duo's initial act was simply that of variety show dancers. Their first television appearance was on the Palmarés light entertainment programme and they were engaged at a nightclub in the Aragon city of Zaragoza, but their contract was cancelled when the club manager decided that they were "too elegant" for the style of the show. Mateos and Mendiola relocated to the Canary Islands in search of work. Here they found that there was an audience for the performance of traditional Spanish music and dance in a form that was adapted to suit international tastes.

The duo were spotted by Leon Deane, manager of the German subsidiary of record company RCA, whilst performing flamenco dance and traditional Spanish songs for mostly German tourists  in the Tres Islas Hotel on the island of Fuerteventura.  María, who was the only one who spoke English, served as a bridge between the promotion managers and the duo to reach an agreement. Deane invited them to Hamburg so they could do a voice test at the record company. He was the prime mover behind what became Baccara,  developing their stage performance while recruiting their instrumental support. Mateos and Mendiola were retitled Baccara, after the name of the black rose, in reference to the women's dark Spanish appearance.

Leon Deane is generally credited with the Baccara formula—consisting of breathy lyrics, lush backing, a disco beat and the striking image of two women (Mateos dressed in black, Mendiola in white) dancing. While drawing lightly on Spanish flamenco song and dance tradition, the formula was rooted in 1970s disco music.

Baccara (1977–1981)

Together with fellow writer Frank Dostal, Rolf Soja penned their début single "Yes Sir, I Can Boogie" and most of their other 1970s hits. Recorded in the Netherlands and released in 1977, "Yes Sir, I Can Boogie" was an enormous pan-European hit and was a prime example of the phenomenon that is known as the "summer hit". It is also an example of the Euro disco genre, described in The Independent newspaper in 1999 as follows :
This mind-bending Common Market melding of foreign accents, bad diction, bizarre arrangements and lightweight production, usually top-heavy with strings

"Yes Sir, …" reached the top of the charts in Germany, the Netherlands, the UK, Sweden, Belgium, and Switzerland, and number three in France. Baccara sold more than 16 million copies of "Yes Sir, I Can Boogie" and featured in the 1977 edition of the Guinness Book of Records as the highest-selling female musical duo to date. They were the first female duo to reach number one in the UK, and had the only number one by a Spanish artist in the UK until Julio Iglesias, four years later.

Later that year, a self-titled album, written and produced by Soja and Dostal, was released. The album Baccara was the first platinum selling album—actually double platinum in 1978—by a foreign group in Finland. In 2013, the album still remains the sixth biggest selling album of all time in Finland.

A follow-up single, "Sorry, I'm a Lady", was also an international hit, peaking at the top of the charts in Germany, the Netherlands and Belgium and reaching the top ten in the UK, Sweden and Switzerland. Most of Baccara's recordings were sung in English although they also recorded in Spanish, German and French. They recorded different language versions of some songs (see Discography below).

Touring in Europe during the late 1970s helped the duo establish a firm fan base in Germany (where their records continued to be produced) and the Scandinavian countries, and their Spanish-flavoured interpretation of the disco sound also brought them recognition in Japan and Russia. Baccara represented West Germany at the eighth World Popular Song Festival held in November 1977 – until it ended in 1989 the largest such contest in the world. Their song, "Mad in Madrid", came 14th out of 37 participating countries.

In 1978 the second Baccara album, Light My Fire, was released across Europe, and whilst not matching the international success of the first, it spawned the single "Parlez-vous français?" which was selected as Luxembourg's entry in that year's Eurovision Song Contest. Despite full marks from Italy, Portugal and Spain the duo finished in seventh place. However high sales, particularly in Denmark, Sweden and Belgium, meant that the single was a commercial success.

Further recognition came in 1978 when Baccara was granted Germany's most prestigious media award, Burda Publishing Group's Bambi prize. This is offered annually to "celebrities whose abilities have impressed, moved and enthused the people in Germany". The duo made regular television appearances, becoming weekly guests on Sacha Distel's show in the UK, and on Musikladen in Germany. 1978 was the high point of Baccara's artistic and commercial success. Late that year the duo released the single "The Devil Sent You to Laredo" with "Somewhere in Paradise" as its B side. Both of these Baccara recordings have become iconic. "Somewhere in Paradise" (with its allusions to life after death) is regularly played by Christian radio stations while "The Devil…" (with its background pistol shots) is sometimes identified with the gay community. A Spanish-language version of "The Devil…" ("El diablo te mandó a Laredo") was released at the same time as the English one, and both the original English version and "Somewhere in Paradise" subsequently featured on the duo's first greatest hits compilation, The Hits of Baccara, released under the name Los Éxitos de Baccara in Spain and South America.

In 1979, the album Colours and the separately-recorded single "Eins plus eins ist eins", released to mark the United Nations' International Year of the Child and celebrate the 20th anniversary of the UN adoption of the Declaration of the Rights of the Child. Although still successful, sales of these and other releases in 1979 were disappointing.

Baccara's fourth and final album in the band's original incarnation was Bad Boys, released in 1981. By this time, the disco sound had been overshadowed by newer music movements such as punk, new wave and synthpop in much of Europe and interest was largely confined to those countries where the duo had an established fan base, notably Germany. The album was not released in the UK or US; they never achieved any recognition in the US despite some of their songs being given significant airplay. One music critic suggested that the Baccara formula lacked artistic depth but had been "mined for all it was worth" over two years until public interest moved on to other things. The same critic also drew attention to an element of "anti-feminist subservience" in the lyrics of some Baccara songs.

The New Musical Express commented in May 2002 (page 6): "Think what you like about Baccara, seen today their 1978 Eurovision performance has a certain style while their competition from that event looks dated and amateurish".

Split
The 1980 single release of "Sleepy-Time-Toy" led to a disagreement within Baccara over the vocal mix used. Mendiola complained that her voice was not given sufficient prominence in the song's arrangement and sued RCA for breach of contract.  Mendiola's case was that the song should not have been released as a Baccara recording when it amounted to a Mateos solo. A court hearing in Munich resulted in 250,000 records being recalled from dealers and a revised recording with a new vocal mix being issued in place of the original. A 28-second instrumental bridge was removed from the start of the recording (thereby reducing the play time from 6:12 to 5:44) and the vocals were remixed so as to give Mendiola and Mateos equal prominence. The artwork for the single's cover appears to have remained unchanged. The single failed to chart successfully (see Discography below).

As a result of the dispute, relationships between all parties involved were damaged. One consequence of this was that Soja and Dostal were not involved with Baccara's final album. The duo recorded Bad Boys with Bruce Baxter and Graham Sacher in the UK. Neither the album nor its spin-off single "Colorado" were successful. In 1981, after RCA declined to renew their contract, Mateos and Mendiola ended their professional partnership and both launched solo careers.

By 1988, both artists had released a series of singles and one studio album each of their own – Mendiola with Born Again and Mateos with Spanish Dreams under the name Mayte Mathée — which saw moderate success amongst Baccara's original fan base. Mateos' Spanish Dreams was re-released on CD in Germany in the 2000s under the title Noche Latina but Mendiola's Born Again still remains unreleased in digital format. However, there remained a demand for Baccara's music, particularly on the European television circuit, and by the end of the decade both Mateos and Mendiola had formed their own versions of Baccara with new singing partners. Despite a series of name and line-up changes, both Baccara duos continued to perform around Europe and have released new albums. Both have also made re-recordings of their hits for various minor record labels, which are regularly re-packaged and re-issued under the original Baccara name, occasionally with photos of the original duo, Mateos and Mendiola, on the album covers. However, the original song versions - those recorded between 1977 and 1981 - remain the property of Sony Music Entertainment, which now holds the rights to the RCA back catalogue.

On the occasion of Baccara's 30th Anniversary, Sony-BMG Germany released a comprehensive three CD box set on 31 August 2007. This collection includes 50 RCA original recordings. Several songs such as "Mad in Madrid", "Amoureux", "Baila tú", "En el año 2000", "Eins plus eins ist eins" and "Candido" made their debut on CD. The only tracks missing from this otherwise comprehensive career retrospective are the US 12" versions of "Yes Sir, I Can Boogie" and "Sorry, I'm a Lady" from debut album Baccara, the full 12 minute album version of "Baby, Why Don't You Reach Out?"/"Light My Fire" and the extended album version of "Darling" from 1978's Light My Fire and the extended 12" versions of "Body-Talk" and "By 1999" from 1979's Colours.

After the split, Mateos and Mendiola never performed together again. However, the two women remained on friendly terms. When Mateos married in Stockholm in 1982, Mendiola attended as the wedding guest. There Mendiola met a fellow guest who she subsequently married and with whom she had two sons. Mateos's marriage failed and in 2010 she was living in Hamburg, where she worked as a dance instructor when not touring with her own revived version of Baccara. In 2010 Mendiola was living in Madrid and still performing as a singer.

Mayte Mateos' Baccara (1983–present)

Following the original Baccara's dissolution in 1981 Mayte Mateos released three solo singles through the RCA-Victor label, "Souvenirs from Paradise", "Recuerdos del ayer" and "Malaguena", the first two produced by Rolf Soja. Re-forming as Baccara in 1983 with Marisa Pérez, a contemporary of Mateos and Mendiola at the Spanish TV ballet company, Mateos re-established the band on the European entertainment circuit. Pérez was followed by a succession of partners including Ángela Muro, Sole García, Jane Comerford, Carmen, Cristina Sevilla, Paloma Blanco, Isabel Patton, Romy Abradelo, Rose, Francesca Rodrigues and María Marín. Mateos' current singing partner is once again fellow Spaniard Paloma Blanco. Although having no new hits to their name, Mateos' Baccara have remained in demand for television and live performances, performing the band's extensive back catalogue — versions of which have been released as compilations — as well as up-tempo interpretations of traditional Spanish songs.

In 1999, Mateos and Cristina Sevilla released a new studio album through RCA-Victor/Sony-BMG, Baccara 2000, as well as an updated dance version of breakthrough hit "Yes Sir, I Can Boogie" as a single.

In 2004, Mayte Mateos was once again involved with Eurovision, when she took part (along with Cristina Sevilla) in the Swedish Melodifestivalen preselection contest to represent Sweden with the song "Soy tu Venus". However, Baccara lost out to local star Lena Philipsson, who eventually placed fifth in the competition. A full-length studio album recorded in Sweden, Soy tu Venus, followed.

A new Baccara album with Mayte Mateos and Paloma Blanco, entitled Satin ...In Black & White and produced by the original Baccara team Rolf Soja and Frank Dostal, was released on 30 May 2008. This album contained remakes of original Baccara recordings from the late 1970s and some new songs. Although appreciated by Baccara fans, sales of the album were disappointing.

In 2013 Mayte sang on a cover version of "Yes Sir I Can Boogie" by the London indie rock band Sala & The Strange Sound.

In 2016 Mateos Baccara collab with  Fundacion Tony Manera with a cover song of "Dame un Poco de Tu Amor" by "Juan Carlos Calderón"

In 2020 Mateos's Baccara version announced a tour, but because of pandemic happened it got delayed and until today no confirmed dates when are they gonna tour again

On September 11, 2021, Mateos original partner "Mendiola" died and post in her personal Facebook and in their page of Baccara Oficial <ref
 "María Mendiola my original partner in Baccara has passed away, May she rest in peace"

So many articles, newspapers and even in social media put a picture of Mateos on Death news of Mendiola and some people thought she's the one who died, and in Mateos personal Facebook account post "I strongly request that the painful death of María Mendiola, be very clear on social media. Many people i know and family have thought it was me"

Maria Mendiola's Baccara (1985–2021)

Initially called New Baccara to distinguish it from Mayte Mateos' re-formed Baccara, Mendiola teamed up with vocalist Marisa Pérez and in 1987 reached the top five in Spain and top 40 in Germany with the single "Call Me Up", written by Ian Cussick. 1988 saw the duo release a series of Euro-influenced Hi-NRG dance tracks on the Bellaphon recording label. "Call Me Up", "Fantasy Boy" and "Touch Me" were produced by Luis Rodríguez, and were big club hits across Europe. A version of Bette Midler's "Wind Beneath My Wings", released on the Loading Bay label in the late 1990s, was also a hit in UK clubs. Towards the end of the decade New Baccara was renamed back to Baccara, and releases continued, although the group did not chart as their output was directed towards the club scene with singles pressed in strictly limited quantities.

Mendiola and Pérez were stars of the UK 2000 tour and appeared at Wembley, London with various other music groups. In 2004, they appeared on British reality show Hit Me Baby One More Time.

In August 2005, Mendiola and Pérez were honoured with a memorial on Vienna's "Musical Mile", along its Hollywood-style "Walk of the Stars".

In late 2008 Marisa Pérez was diagnosed with acute polyarthritis. It was agreed that until she recovered, her place at Baccara live performances would be taken by Mendiola's niece Laura Mendiola. This measure (said to be temporary) allowed Mendiola's Baccara to honour its outstanding commitments over the period Pérez needed to recover.

Marisa Pérez left the band shortly afterwards and Maria  has been performing with Cristina Sevilla since then. In 2016 they released a new version of "Yes Sir, I Can Boogie" with the band Plugin. In 2017 they released I Belong to Your Heart produced by Luis Rodríguez with 11 brand new songs plus "I Belong to Your Heart" extended and a new "Fantasy Boy" version.

In November 2020, "Yes Sir, I Can Boogie" returned to the UK charts after it was featured in several online videos posted by members of the Scotland football team. The team qualified for the European championships, and were heard singing the song in celebratory videos. It became a 'new' number 57 hit for Sony Music on the national singles chart and peaked at number 2 on the Official Singles Sales Chart Top 100. Maria Mendiola was quoted as saying she would be happy to record a new version for the finals.

In June 2021, Scottish DJ George 'GBX' Bowie released a new remixed version of "Yes Sir, I Can Boogie" for Scottish fans to use as an anthem for UEFA Euro 2020. This dance version included new vocals from Baccara and also reached the Official Singles Sales Chart Top 100, peaking at number 11.

Mendiola died in Madrid on 11 September 2021, at the age of 69, surrounded by her family in hospital  Her current partner Cristina Sevilla wrote and posted on their Instagram @baccaraoficial  "How hard is it for me to post this.. María, wonderful artist, but for me above all.. My friend has left us today. I am lost for words.. I can only thank so much how i have received from her and tell her what i had chance to tell her so many times in my life... I Love You".. Until today Mendiola's death cause wasn't ever confirmed, but her family said that she had been dealing with blood deficiency for two decades 

Cristina Sevilla's Baccara (2022–present)

After the death of Maria Mendiola and at the great insistence of fans, producers and artistic promoters, Cristina Sevilla agrees to continue with Mendiola's legacy, as a way of paying a permanent tribute to her memory.  On January 26, 2022, the official announcement of her new partner is made: Helen de Quiroga, who already has a consolidated career in music and who has also been a backing vocalist for international artists such as Miguel Bosé and Alejandro Sanz.  This is how the public discovers an updated and renewed version of Baccara, but which preserves its essence, its elegance, its good work and professionalism.

Discography

Baccara

Studio albums

Compilation albums 
 1978: The Hits of Baccara (RCA Victor)
 1990: The Original Hits (BMG-Ariola)
 1991: Star Collection (BMG-Ariola)
 1993: The Collection (BMG-Ariola)
 1994: Yes Sir, I Can Boogie (BMG-Ariola)
 1994: Star Gala (BMG-Ariola/Spectrum)
 1995: Golden Stars (BMG-Ariola)
 1998: The Collection (BMG-Ariola)
 1999: Woman to Woman (BMG-Ariola/Disky Communications)
 2001: The Best of Baccara – Original Hits (BMG-Ariola/Hot Town Music-Paradiso)
 2005: The Best of Baccara (Sony BMG/Camden UK)
 2006: The Very Best of Baccara (Sony BMG)
 2007: 30th Anniversary (Sony BMG)

Singles

María Mendiola's Baccara AKA New Baccara

Albums 
 1990: F.U.N.
 1999: Made in Spain
 2000: Face to Face
 2002: Greatest Hits (Re-recordings plus 4 new songs)
 2006: Singles Collection (Compilation plus 2 new songs)
 2017: I Belong to Your Heart (11 new songs plus "I Belong to Your Heart" extended and 2017 Fantasy Boy edit)

Maxi singles 
 1989: "Fantasy Boy"/"Touch Me" (Loading bay Records UK)
 1989: "Call Me Up" 
 1990: "Yes Sir, I Can Boogie '90"
 2002: "Wind Beneath My Wings"
 2005: "Yes Sir, I Can Boogie 2005"
 2018: "Gimme Your Love" (Bobby To Extended Mix)

Singles 
 1987: "Call Me Up" / "Talismán"
 1988: "Fantasy Boy"
 1989: "Touch Me"
 1990: "Yes Sir, I Can Boogie '90"
 1999: "Sorry, I'm a Lady" (Dance Version)
 2000: "I Want to Be in Love with Somebody"
 2000: "Face to Face"
 2002: "Yes Sir, I Can Boogie" (Copa Remix)
 2005: "Yes Sir, I Can Boogie 2005"
 2008: "Fantasy Boy 2008" [Digital single]
 2016: "Yes Sir, I Can Boogie" (Plugin & Baccara) [Digital single]
 2017: "I Belong to Your Heart"
 2017: "Super Sexy Baby"

Mayte Mateos' Baccara AKA Baccara 2000

Albums 
 1994: Our Very Best (Re-recordings plus five new songs)
 1999: Baccara 2000
 2004: Soy tu Venus
 2008: Satin ... In Black & White

Maxi singles 
 1999: "Yes Sir, I Can Boogie '99"
 2004: "Soy tu Venus"
 2008: "Nights in Black Satin"

Singles 
 1994: "Yes Sir, I Can Boogie" (Italo Disco Mix)
 1994: "Sorry, I'm a Lady" (Italo Disco Mix)
 1999: "Yes Sir, I Can Boogie '99"
 2011: "Christmas Medley" (Radio Edit) [Digital single]
 2013: "Yes Sir, I Can Boogie 2013" (with Sala & the Strange Sounds)
 2016: "Dame un Poco de Tu Amor" (with Fundacion Tony Manero)

References

External links
 Baccara page

 

Spanish dance music groups
Eurodisco groups
Pop music duos
Disco duos
Spanish musical duos
Eurovision Song Contest entrants for Luxembourg
Eurovision Song Contest entrants of 1978
1977 establishments in Spain
1981 disestablishments in Spain
English-language singers from Spain
Female musical duos
Musical groups established in 1977
Musical groups disestablished in 1981
Melodifestivalen contestants of 2004